Elections to Redditch Borough Council were held on 1 May 2008. One third of the council was up for election and the Conservative Party gained overall control of the council from no overall control. Overall turnout was 33.2%.

This was the first time in 26 years that the Conservative party had control of Redditch council. This came after the Conservatives gained 4 seats from the Labour party, with local and national issues being said to be behind the results. The results in Redditch were described as being representative of the mood of the electorate nationally.

After the election, the composition of the council was:
Conservative 15
Labour 10
Liberal Democrat 3
British National Party 1

Election result

Ward results

References

2008 Redditch election result
Ward results
Redditch
Tories take control after 26-year wait

2008
2008 English local elections
2000s in Worcestershire